From List of National Natural Landmarks, these are the National Natural Landmarks in New Hampshire.  There are 11 in total.

New Hampshire
National Natural Landmarks